Dontsa Pass, Is situated in the Eastern Cape, province of South Africa, on the regional road R352, between Keiskammahoek and Stutterheim.

Mountain passes of the Eastern Cape